Khalid Habash Al-Suwaidi (born 10 October 1984 in Qatar) is a male shot putter from Qatar.

Biography
His personal best throw is 20.54 metres, achieved in June 2005 in Minsk. This is the Qatari record.

Achievements

References

External links

1984 births
Living people
Qatari male shot putters
Qatari male discus throwers
Asian Games medalists in athletics (track and field)
Olympic athletes of Qatar
Athletes (track and field) at the 2004 Summer Olympics
Athletes (track and field) at the 2002 Asian Games
Athletes (track and field) at the 2006 Asian Games
Athletes (track and field) at the 2010 Asian Games
Asian Games silver medalists for Qatar
Medalists at the 2006 Asian Games